Bryan Mendoza Cruz (born 20 September 1997), also known as "La Cobra", is a Mexican professional footballer who plays as a winger.

Club career
On September 1, 2019, Mendoza scored his first goal in Liga MX against Toluca in a 2–1 win.

Honours
Atlante
Liga de Expansión MX: Apertura 2021

Individual
Liga MX Goal of the Tournament: 2020–21

References

External links
 
 

Living people
1997 births
Footballers from Guerrero
Association football midfielders
Atlético Morelia players
Club Universidad Nacional footballers
Liga MX players
Liga Premier de México players
Tercera División de México players
Sportspeople from Acapulco
Mexican footballers